Mandegi, also rendered as Mangi or Mandeki, may refer to:
 Mandegi-ye Olya